Nextag was an independent price comparison service website for products, travel, and education. It started as a website where buyers and sellers could negotiate prices for computers and electronics products. From 2000, the business model focused on comparison shopping.  NexTag also owned Hamburg, Germany-based Guenstiger.de. It provided functionality for tracking the historical prices of a product across various sellers.

Nextag's headquarters were in Redwood Shores, California.

In June 2007, Providence Equity Partners purchased a two-thirds majority of the company. Los Angeles-based private equity firm Regent purchased the company in March 2015. The Nextag.com website went offline on 28 December 2018.

Acquisitions 
In November 2010, Nextag announced the acquisition of nextcoupons.com, a Santa Monica, California-based coupon company. This was a way for Nextag to bring in more talent and resources. In April 2011, Nextag acquired Germany's Guenstiger.de GmbH, the leading online comparison shopping website in Europe's market. In October 2011, Nextag acquired thingbuzz, a real-time social shopping platform that tracks the conversation about products in the social media sphere, in a bid to socialize the online shopping experience for its users. At the very end of that year, FanSnap was acquired by Nextag. This was the fifth acquisition in only 15 months. According to former Nextag CEO Jeffrey Katz, these acquisitions enabled Nextag to be a one-stop e-commerce shop for various products including tickets.

Recognition 
NexTag was ranked by Time magazine as one of the fifty best websites of 2008. Time magazine called Nextag the "plainest comparative-shopping site on the Web", but commended it for quick and comprehensive shopping search results. Nextag provided customers with product reviews and provided the price history for each product.

As of 28 March 2018, it was ranked one of the "10 Top Price Comparison Websites" by Shopify.

References 

Comparison shopping websites
Internet search engines
Financial services companies established in 1999
Companies based in Redwood City, California
Online marketplaces of the United States
Private equity portfolio companies
Providence Equity Partners companies
1999 establishments in California